The American Servicemen's Union (ASU), an unofficial union for the U.S. military, was formed by Andy Stapp in 1967 in opposition to the Vietnam War.

The group published an underground newspaper called Fed Up from Fort Lewis

References

Anti–Vietnam War groups
Workers World Party
Trade unions in the United States
Trade unions established in 1967
1967 establishments in the United States